The men's 100 metre freestyle S9 event at the 2014 Commonwealth Games as part of the swimming programme took place on 24 July at the Tollcross International Swimming Centre in Glasgow, Scotland.

The medals were presented by Sir Philip Craven, President of the International Paralympic Committee and the quaichs were presented by David Grevemberg, CEO of Glasgow 2014.

Records
Prior to this competition, the existing world and Commonwealth Games records were as follows.

The following records were established during the competition:

Results

Heats

Final

References

Men's 0100 metre freestyle S9
Commonwealth Games